The Toowoomba Raiders Football Club is an Australian football (soccer) club from Toowoomba, Queensland. The club was formed in 1996, and currently have teams in the Brisbane Premier League Division 1 league. They finished 12th in 2010, however despite only being 1 place above the drop zone, they did have a 22-point buffer ahead of The Gap FC

External links
Toowoomba Raiders Football Club Official Website

Association football clubs established in 1996
Soccer clubs in Queensland
Brisbane Premier League teams
1996 establishments in Australia
Sport in Toowoomba
Viking Age in popular culture